Fresh'n was a United States toilet paper substitute, a moistened flushable biodegradable toilet towel.  It was marketed with the slogan, "I don't use toilet paper."

References

Toilet paper